Karl von Vierordt (1868) was the first to record a law of time perception which relates perceived duration to actual duration over different interval magnitudes, and according to task complexity.

Vierordt's law is "a robust phenomenon in time estimation research that has been observed with different time estimation methods". It states that, retrospectively, "short" intervals of time tend to be overestimated, and "long" intervals of time tend to be underestimated. The other major paradigm of time estimation methodology measures time prospectively.

See also

References

 Dyschronometria
 Sequential activities
 Frequent and infrequent THC consumption
 Caused by THC (in German)
 Oxford
 Caused by emotions

Perception
Time